New Colonial Hotel, also known as the Stagecoach Inn and Sechler Sport Distributing, is a historic hotel in Meyersdale, Somerset County, Pennsylvania. It was built in 1904, and is a four-story brick building on a sandstone foundation. It measures 64 feet wide by 70 feet deep, has a "U"-shaped plan, and is in the Colonial Revival style. It features a broad front porch, balcony, and dropped cornice between the third and fourth floors. The architect is believed to be Charles E. Cassell. The hotel was home to the Pennsylvania Maple Festival starting in 1948.

It was added to the National Register of Historic Places in 2005.

References

External links
Pennsylvania Maple Festival website

Hotel buildings on the National Register of Historic Places in Pennsylvania
Colonial Revival architecture in Pennsylvania
Hotel buildings completed in 1903
Buildings and structures in Somerset County, Pennsylvania
National Register of Historic Places in Somerset County, Pennsylvania